Dolno Sonje is a village in the municipality of Sopište, North Macedonia. It is located on the other side of Mount Vodno from Skopje, but a road running around the mountain connects the two communities.

Dolno Sonje is a popular vacation spot for its clean air, beautiful surroundings, and medieval churches.

Demographics
As of the 2021 census, Dolno Sonje had 793 residents with the following ethnic composition:
Macedonians 689
Persons for whom data are taken from administrative sources 82
Serbs 9
Vlachs 7
Others 6

According to the 2002 census, the village had a total of 689 inhabitants. Ethnic groups in the village include:
Macedonians 678
Serbs 4
Aromanians 2
Others 5

Most residents work in Skopje.

References

Villages in Sopište Municipality